Tom Overend (born 30 April 1953) is a Canadian speed skater. He competed in two events at the 1976 Winter Olympics.

References

1953 births
Living people
Canadian male speed skaters
Olympic speed skaters of Canada
Speed skaters at the 1976 Winter Olympics
Sportspeople from Abbotsford, British Columbia
20th-century Canadian people